Sheona Macleod is an English physician, chair of the Conference of Postgraduate Medical Deans (COPMeD), lead for Health Education England’s deans, and the postgraduate medical dean in the East Midlands.

Life 
Macleod studied at the University of Glasgow, and trained as a GP in Paisley. She was awarded an honorary professorship from the University of Nottingham in 2016.

She cites Vicky Osgood, a clinician and educationalist, as her inspiration, in a Women in Medicine project by the Royal College of Physicians.

Macleod has been a General Practitioner in Ashbourne, Derbyshire since 1989. Macleod was appointed GP dean for the East Midlands in 2009 and in 2012, was appointed Postgraduate Dean at East Midlands Healthcare Workforce Deanery, part of Health Education East Midlands. She leads the Health Education England working group on enhancing the working lives of junior doctors.

References 

Year of birth missing (living people)
Living people
Women in medicine
Alumni of the University of Glasgow
Alumni of the University of Glasgow Medical School
British general practitioners
Scottish women medical doctors